Ralph Meredith Riggs(16 June 1895- 13 January 1971) was the 8th General Superintendent of the Assemblies of God (1953–1959).

 Riggs was also a teacher at Bethany Bible College in Santa Cruz, California in the mid-1960s
Books by Ralph M. Riggs. Living in Christ: Our Identification with Him', So Send I You: A study in Personal Soul Winning', 'The Spirit Himself.

Early life and ministry 
Riggs was born in Coal Creek, Tennessee. He converted to Christianity at the age of 10 and was baptized at 14. In 1914, he attended the first General Council of the Assemblies of God in Hot Springs, Arkansas. In 1916, he graduated from the Rochester Bible Training School and was ordained a minister. He pastored a church in nearby Syracuse, New York.

References

1895 births
Assemblies of God
American Assemblies of God pastors
People from Rocky Top, Tennessee
1971 deaths
Religious leaders from Syracuse, New York